

Geography & demographics
Sarairasi is located at 26°47′N 82°08′E / 26.78°N 82.13°E / 26.78; 82.13[1]. It has an average elevation of 97 metres (318 feet) above sea level. As of 2001  SARAIRASI had a population of nearly 8000 males constituting 52% of the population and females 48%. Sarairasi has an average literacy rate of 72%, higher than the national average of 59.5%: male literacy is 80%, and female literacy is 20%. In Faizabad, 14% of the population is under 10 years of age. Suryavanshi Rajputs are the Majority in the Village along with sizeable population of OBC,SC and ST community.And it is a Thakur(Rajput) dominated village.

Accessibility
Sarairasi is well connected with Lucknow, Varanasi, Gorakhpur and Allahabad.  It is situated exactly 12 km away from the District Headquarters on Akbarpur Road.

By air the nearest airports are Lucknow (128 km) and Varanasi (200 km).

By road Sarairasi is situated on the Akbarpur road and has good connectivity with Lucknow (128 km), Varanasi (200 km), Allahabad (165 km) and Gorakhpur (130 km). The state government's Road Transport Service runs regular and frequent buses to and from these cities.

By Rail The Indian Railways network connects Faizabad directly with Lucknow (3 hours.), Varanasi (4 hours.) and Allahabad (5 hours). Direct trains also connect Faizabad to Kolkata, New Delhi and Mumbai.

Climate
Summer (March to July) temperatures can range from 35 to 45 degrees Celsius. Winters (November to February ) temperatures can range from 6 to 25 degrees Celsius. Rains during monsoon season (July to September).

Places to See
Kalimai chaura: literally meaning 'Place of Lord kali', this temple is beautifully built and the cleanliness and the pollution free environment is just spiritual.
Gayatri Temple: located in Kali mai chaura area, this temple is beautifully built with eye catching Idol of Gayatri Devi. The temple is looked after by Mahant baba and Sarvan Baba.
Ramlila Manch: located next to the Gayatri mandir and kali mai chura. This is the main attraction of local villagers in month of navratri since Ramlila is performed here.
Nisha Baba's well: this is situated adjacent to Akbarpur Road passing through Sarairasi village. It was constructed in 1898 in memory of great freedom fighter "Nisha Baba" , this well has great cultural significance as people of the village worship at this place as a part of their marriage ceremony. 
the river saryu also gives a good attraction to the travellers.

Shopping
Purabazar: next to Rajepur, is the central market of Sarairasi village. One can find vegetables, fruits and spices in this market. Also, there are numerous jewellery shops in the area which cater to Faizabad town and many villages which lie in nearby areas. Some leading cloth shops could be easily found in this area. This market also has many prominent books and stationary shops of the town.
Darshan nagar: About 4 kilometers away from sarairasi (towards Faizabad) lies the Drashannagar market which has a multitude of shops. The market also has some seed shops which cater to the farmers of the adjoining regions.

Social Institution

Team ek pahal foundation, sarairasi ayodhya
Team ek pahal foundation this is a registered non government organisation (N.G.O.) 
1.That works for the welfare of those students who belong to the depressed class.(If a student wants to learn, organisation is always ready to help him .)
2.This organisation also work for pure and clean environment.(i.e. prevent pollution from our environment, Forestation)
3.Organisation also work for the welfare of old-age .
4. And the according to slogan of organisation"Hamari dharohar hamari pahchan " this organisation also work for our ancient monuments,culture,customs.

Educational Institutes 
Dr.RamPrassana Maniram singh Mahavidyalaya
H.B.S. School
C.B.S Intercollege
 Government operated schools up to 8th standard.
shri ram lagan chandrabali Computer training center

References 

Cities and towns in Faizabad district